The cabinet of Mari Kiviniemi was Finland's 71st government. It was appointed by President Tarja Halonen on 22 June 2010. The cabinet's Prime Minister was Mari Kiviniemi. 

The Kiviniemi Cabinet was a centre-right coalition government composed of the Centre Party, the National Coalition, the Green League, and the Swedish People's Party. There were 12 women and 8 men in the cabinet, which made it the second cabinet in Finnish history with female majority. The Kiviniemi cabinet also had more ministers than any of its predecessors; it had 20 ministers, while the former cabinet had 18.

It was succeeded by the cabinet of Jyrki Katainen on 22 June 2011.

Ministers 

|}

References 

Kiviniemi
2010 establishments in Finland
2011 disestablishments in Finland
Cabinets established in 2010
Cabinets disestablished in 2011